Events from the year 1968 in art.

Events
March 5 – Musical chess match between Marcel Duchamp and John Cage takes place at Ryerson Polytechnic, Toronto.
May 2 – Christ Church Picture Gallery in Oxford, England, designed by Powell and Moya, is opened.
June 3 – Radical feminist Valerie Solanas shoots Andy Warhol at his New York City studio, The Factory; he survives after a 5-hour operation.
July 17 – Release of the animated musical fantasy film Yellow Submarine in the United Kingdom, directed by George Dunning with art direction by Heinz Edelmann.
August 20 – The National Gallery of Victoria in Melbourne, Australia, designed by Sir Roy Grounds, is opened.
September 15 – The Neue Nationalgalerie in West Berlin, Germany, designed by Mies van der Rohe, is opened.
November 7 – New building for the São Paulo Museum of Art (MASP) in Brazil, designed by Lina Bo Bardi, is inaugurated.
Rubens' The Adoration of the Magi (1634) is installed as an altarpiece at King's College Chapel, Cambridge.

Awards
 Archibald Prize: William Edwin Pidgeon – Lloyd Rees
 Elaine Hamilton wins first prize at the Biennale de Menton, France

Exhibitions
 Eva Hesse – Chain Polymers, Fischbach Gallery, W. 57th Street, New York City
 Ralph Hotere – Black Paintings, Auckland, New Zealand

Works
 William Anders – Earthrise (photograph)
 Edward Bawden – Tottenham Hale and Highbury & Islington tile motifs on London Underground's Victoria line
 Julia Black – Walthamstow Central tile motif on London Underground's Victoria line
 Alexander Calder – Gwenfritz (stabile)
 Donald De Lue – The Special Warfare Memorial Statue
 Paul Delvaux – The Sacrifice of Iphigenia
 Mark di Suvero – Snowplow (sculpture)
 Joseph Drapell – Life (sculpture, Halifax, Nova Scotia)
 Tom Eckersley – Finsbury Park, King's Cross St Pancras and Euston tile motifs on London Underground's Victoria line
 M. C. Escher – Metamorphosis III (colored woodcut print)
 Alan Fletcher – Warren Street tile motif on London Underground's Victoria line
 Ángela Gurría - Señal in Mexico City, Mexico created for the occasion of the 1968 Summer Olympics 
 Barbara Hepworth – Two Figures (sculpture), Three Obliques (Walk In) (sculpture)
 David Hockney
 Christopher Isherwood and Don Bachardy 
 Marilyn Tapestry
 Dani Karavan – Monument to the Negev Brigade on  hill overlooking Beersheba, Israel (completed)
 Eduardo Kingman – Fin de Mascarada
 Joan Miró – begins series The navigator's hope
 Henry Moore – Three-Piece No. 3: Vertebrae (Working Model)
 Robert Motherwell – Open #23 (loaned by Graham Gund to Museum of Fine Arts, Boston)
 Otto Muehl, Günter Brus and other followers of Viennese Actionism – Kunst und Revolution (performance art)
 Isamu Noguchi – Octetra (concrete sculpture)
 Gerhard Richter – Domplatz, Mailand ("Cathedral Square, Milan")
 Monica Sjöö – God Giving Birth
 Kenneth Snelson – Needle Tower
 Hans Unger – Blackhorse Road and Seven Sisters tile motifs on London Underground's Victoria line
 David Wynne – River God Tyne and Swans in Flight (sculptures, Newcastle Civic Centre)
 Pangborn-Herndon Memorial Site (memorial column)

Births
 May 21 – Hans-Ulrich Obrist, Swiss-born curator
 June 3 – Eric White, American visual artist
 July 6 – Gaspare Manos, Thai-Italian painter and sculptor
 July 11 – Patrik Andiné, Swedish painter
 July 23 – Paulo Henrique, Portuguese choreographer and multidisciplinary artist
 August 16 – Wolfgang Tillmans, German fine-art photographer
 September 17 – David Shrigley, British visual artist
 December 13 – Michael Triegel, German painter
 December 23 – Manuel Rivera-Ortiz, Puerto Rican documentary photographer
 date unknown 
Sika Foyer, Togolese American artist 
Nahem Shoa, British portrait painter

Deaths
 February 11 – Jacob Steinhardt, German-born Jewish painter and woodcut artist (born 1887)
 April 26 – John Heartfield, German graphic designer (born 1891)
 May 9 – Harold Gray, American cartoonist, created Little Orphan Annie (born 1894)
 May 21 – Bror Hjorth, Swedish sculptor (born 1894)
 May 28 – Kees van Dongen, Dutch Fauvist painter (born 1877)
 June 17 – Cassandre, French graphic designer (born 1901)
 July 2 – Sir Hans Heysen, German-born Australian watercolour painter (born 1877)
 July 16 – William John Leech, Irish painter (born 1881)
 August 8 – Orovida Pissarro, English painter and etcher (born 1893)
 October 2 – Marcel Duchamp, influential French artist (born 1887)
 November – Lee Gatch, American painter and mixed-media artist (born 1902)
 November 2 – Estella Solomons, Irish painter (born 1882)
 November 4 – Michel Kikoine, Litvak-born French painter (born 1892)
 November 11 – Janet Sobel, Ukrainian American Abstract Expressionist pioneer of drip painting (born 1893)
 date unknown – William Conor, Irish painter (born 1881)

See also
 1968 in Fine Arts of the Soviet Union

References

 
Years of the 20th century in art
1960s in art